Valaoritis is a surname. Notable people with the surname include:

Aristotelis Valaoritis (1824–1879), Greek poet and politician, great-grandfather of Nanos
Nanos Valaoritis (1921–2019), Greek poet, novelist, and playwright

Greek-language surnames